Charles Joseph "Laddie" Pettiona (10 July 1913 – 23 October 1946) was an Australian rules footballer who played with South Melbourne in the Victorian Football League (VFL).

Family
The son of Thomas Joseph Pettiona (1890-1950), and Annie Maud Pettiona (1895-1966), née Janman, Charles Joseph Pettiona was born at South Melbourne, Victoria on 10 July 1913.

He married Gladwyn Greenway (1915-), later Mrs. William Charles Young, on 9 October 1937. They had two children.

Football
Pettiona, a Port Melbourne recruit, started out at South Melbourne in 1936, two years after his uncle Cecil Pettiona had played for the club.

He made eight appearances in the 1936 VFL season, which included South Melbourne's grand final loss to Collingwood (as 19th man), his first loss in South Melbourne colours.

In 1937 he played six senior games, then didn't appear at all in the 1938 season and was cleared to Sandringham.

Death
On the evening of 23 October 1946 Pettiona was struck and killed by a military truck while cycling down Normanby Road in South Melbourne.

Notes

References

External links
 Charlie Pettiona at The VFA Project. 
 
 
 Charlie Pettiona at Boyles Football Photos.

1913 births
1946 deaths
Australian rules footballers from Melbourne
Sydney Swans players
Port Melbourne Football Club players
Sandringham Football Club players
Road incident deaths in Victoria (Australia)
Cycling road incident deaths
People from South Melbourne